Artur Castela (born 30 July 1993) is a Portuguese basketball player in the LCB league. His position's were Power Forward / center. He most recently played for the team Galitos Barreiro in Portugal.

Biography 
Castela is the only and youngest player that achieved, in Portugal, at the same time, all the Titles of Champion (8 Championships with his Team and 2 times Bichamp, Senior and U-20 at the same Season) and Internationalizations (65 times with the Portugal National Team) as U-16, U-18 and U-20, and has 5 years experience (and 54 Official FIBA - Europe Internationalizations) in European Basketball Championships.

References

External links
 5 players to follow in the Portuguese LPB 2013/14

1993 births
Living people
People from Lisbon
Portuguese men's basketball players
S.L. Benfica basketball players
Power forwards (basketball)
Centers (basketball)